Ehsaas - Kahani Ek Ghar Ki is a Hindi serial that was launched on DD National channel in India. It is the story of people who don’t believe in only " life, but also feeling" the life.

Plot 
The family saga is the story of Parvati (Bhairavi Raichura) her husband Nikhil (Ravi Gossain) and her two sisters whose father has died in a mysterious accident after being cheated by his business partner. The three sisters are now on a mission to destroy the man they think is responsible for their father’s death.

Amidst the drama of hate and vendetta, there is a love triangle when Parvati and one of her sisters discover they love the same man. The main cast consist of
Mukesh Khanna, Arun Govil, Rahul Roy, Kiran Kumar, Sudha Chandran, Navni Parihar, Purvi Jain, Sameer Iqbal Patel.

Cast 
 Mukesh Khanna
 Arun Govil
 Rahul Roy
 Sudha Chandran
 Bhairavi Raichura .. Parvati
 Ravi Gossain... Nikhil
 Purvi Jain ... Meera
 Tarana Singh ... Sheetal
 Sameer Iqbal Patel ... Sudhanshu
 Narendra Gupta ... Era Mama
 Kiran Kumar 
 Avtar Gill ... Vedprakash
 Mohan Bhandari
 Navni Parihar
 Amita Nangia
 Neeraj Bharadwaj
 Prachi Shah
 Sudesh Berry
 Avinash Wadhawan
 Jasbir Thandi...Kulkarni
 Pooja Madan
 Meenakshi Verma
 Rammohan Sharma
 Raju Kher
 Seema Pandey

External links

Official Site

DD National original programming
Indian television soap operas